Hyla orientalis, also known by its common name eastern tree frog, is a species from the genus Hyla. The species was originally described by Jacques von Bedriaga in 1890, and is found in Asia Minor and southeastern Europe.

References

orientalis
Taxa named by Jacques von Bedriaga
Amphibians described in 1890
Amphibians of Turkey
Amphibians of Russia
Amphibians of Iran
Amphibians of Azerbaijan